is a Japanese recreational fishing manga series by Maiko Uchino, serialized in Houbunsha's seinen manga magazine Manga Time Kirara Forward since September 2018. It has been collected in seven tankōbon volumes. An anime television series adaptation by Connect aired from January to March 2022.

Characters
/

The series' protagonist. Her father died three years prior to the events of the series. After her mother remarries she stars living with Koharu. She developed an interest in fishing.

Hiyori's stepsister. Her biological mother and brother died in an accident when she was young. Because she lived far from the ocean, she developed a fascination for the sea.

Hiyori's childhood friend, whose father runs a fishing supplies store.

Media

Manga
Slow Loop is written and illustrated by Maiko Uchino. The series began serialization in Houbunsha's Manga Time Kirara Forward magazine on September 22, 2018.

Volume list

Anime
On December 24, 2020, an anime television series adaptation was announced. The series was animated by Connect, and directed by Noriaki Akitaya, with scripts by Yuka Yamada, characters designed by Shoko Takimoto, who also served as chief animation director, and music composed by Takurō Iga. The series aired from January 7 to March 25, 2022, on AT-X and other networks. Pokapoka Ion, composed of Nao Tōyama and Kiyono Yasuno, performed the opening theme song "Yajirushi." Three ∞ Loop, composed of Rin Kusumi, Natsumi Hioka, and Tomomi Mineuchi, performed the ending theme song "Shuwa Shuwa." Funimation licensed the series outside of Asia.

Episode list

Notes

References

External links
 

2022 anime television series debuts
Anime series based on manga
AT-X (TV network) original programming
Connect (studio)
Crunchyroll anime
Fishing in anime and manga
Houbunsha manga
Kadokawa Dwango franchises
Seinen manga